Penny, between Longworth and Dome Creek on the northeast side of the Fraser River in central British Columbia, offers an access point for outdoor recreational activities. With a community hall and 11 permanent residents, the 40 plus houses are mainly absentee owned, but are occupied seasonally. No utilities infrastructure exists. Prior to the post office permanently closing on 31 December 2013, the community was the only one in Canada that still relied upon the railway for its postal service.

Transportation
A trackside signpost marks the flag stop for Via Rail's Jasper – Prince Rupert train. The immediate Via Rail stops are Longworth to the northwest and Bend to the southeast.

History

Railway
Penny lies at Mile 69.5, Fraser Subdivision. Previously designated as Mile 159 during the line's construction, it was the area headquarters for Foley, Welch and Stewart, the prime contractor. The Siems-Carey headquarters, and a work camp existed at Mile 160. Mr. Flannigan, a contractor at this camp, who considered all the camps maintained exceptional sanitary conditions, complained of IWW agitators seeking better wages and camp conditions. The government sanitary inspector, who described camp conditions as fair, destroyed 20,000 lbs. of beef at about Mile 160, and bacon unfit for human consumption at other camps. He advised contractors to stop dumping garbage into the Fraser River. Soon after, typhoid and diphtheria cases filled the medical outpost. In one 10-day period, the facility treated five victims of dump-car accidents, and the latest patient from Camp 162 had been cut in two. The Miles 160 and 162 camps were both large, and a hospital was mentioned at Mile 160. The true location of the hospital was likely Mile 73 (formerly around Mile 162.5).

Not a planned station on the Grand Trunk Pacific Railway (the Canadian National Railway after nationalization), Penny remained absent from the 1916 timetable. Exclusion from the 1919 and 1921 Official Guides probably reflects that only the employee timetables initially listed it as a footnote. Mention in the 1918 BC towns directory, and on a c.1919 map, suggest a 1917 or 1918 opening date for the station.

The settlement developed between Lindup to its northwest, and Guilford to its southeast. The name, a surname that emerged by the beginning of the 13th century, was selected for unknown reasons. Commonly claimed as an English place name on the list prepared by Josiah Wedgwood (submitted at the request of William P. Hinton, the railway's general manager), no such location existed in the United Kingdom. Furthermore, the name Penny, in use by 1914, predated the station by at least three years. Formerly it was known just as the Engineers' Camp.

Trains sometimes struck straying livestock, but slowed to a crawl if sighted in time. A passenger shelter likely existed prior to replacement in 1927 by a converted section tool house from Miworth. In 1947, the latter burned to the ground. The CNR appointed the first station agent at this time.

A burned out journal box on a freight car immobilized a train at Penny for seven hours in 1955. During the 1960s, 18 cars derailed from an eastbound 98-car freight train in the vicinity, which delayed the westbound passenger train for three hours. In another incident, a head-on collision with a bull moose, just outside Penny, derailed 23 cars of a westbound 50-car freight train.

In 1970, CNR closed its section shop. Isolated communities, like Penny, suffered when the Prince George–McBride way freight ceased operations in 1977. The next year, Penny was one of the 11 communities between Prince Rupert and the Alberta border, where the CNR replaced its agent-operator position with a resident serving as CN Express agent.

The deep snow of the 1981/82 winter near Penny caused hundreds of collisions between moose and trains. By this time, the station was boarded up apart from a small waiting room. In 1988, an ice bridge was built across the Fraser River to carry the station by flatbed truck to its new home, the Prince George Railway & Forestry Museum. Using a raft 18 months earlier, volunteers transported a heritage railway speeder shed and tool shed from Penny to that site.

The remaining passenger shelter was removed in 1996.

Map

Hunting & trapping
Resident Charles Hartsell (1862–1937) was possibly the companion who mistook him for a moose and accidentally shot him in the arm a few miles from Penny in 1919.

John (Jack) Evans (1866–1948), a homesteader, had  trapline through Penny in 1912/13. He paddled and poled to Tête Jaune in 1897, continued to Fort George in 1905, and later settled near Penny. Famed for his horticulture, he was especially popular with the local children for his candy treats. 

Benjamin (Ben) (1883–1955) & Adelia (Ada) (1886–1977) Sykes had relocated from Slim Creek by 1918. Their children were Bessie (1906–43), David (1909–31), Alice (c.1911–2003), Mary (1913–?), Thelma (1915–?), Marjory (1918–?), Leona (1922–80), and Faye Lucille (c.1923–2003). When the family left in 1924, the school closed owing to insufficient pupils.

By 1921, the recognized guides for big game hunters in the Penny area were B. T. Sykes, C. Hartsell and J. R. Norboe (c.1853–1921) (Narboe alternate spelling). Ben had guided with John Norboe, who died of a seizure in 
Nels Pedersen's house . John's brother Mac drowned that year at Eaglet Lake, but was misreported as Slim Lake.

Forestry
A. Roy Spurr (1885–1954), who arrived at the Tête Jaune railhead in 1911, was a fur trader, who operated a store, café and accommodation, and provided a bookkeeping service, at camps during the railway construction. Using his savings, he opened a sawmill at Penny in 1917, later buying out his partners. The mill lay south of the village on the riverbank. As early as the 1920s, fellow lumber operators recognized his sawmilling and business expertise and sought his advice. Spurr's Red Mountain Lumber Co and the Penny Lumber Co. were both in operation by 1918, but a later misconception that the former opened years later possibly inspired the questionable claim that Spurr also had an ownership interest in the latter.

In bankruptcy by 1921, the assets of the Penny Lumber were acquired by company president, George H. Lipsett (1866–1955). Located south of the CNR track on Rankin Creek, it operated as Penny Lumber, and then as G.H. Lipsett Lumber, until fire totally destroyed the mill in 1926.

In the 1920s, with logging limited to the winter and fall seasons to facilitate the hauling of logs over snow and ice, loggers were transient. However, year round work existed in sawmill towns such as Giscome, Aleza Lake, Hutton, Penny, and Longworth. Injuries and death were common in sawmills and logging camps. Sawyer Laughlin McKenzie (1856–1923) was killed when a saw severed his body from head to hips at the Red Mountain Lumber Co.

The proceeds from selling Red Mountain Lumber Co. during the 1928 boom year provided Spurr with the funds to acquire other mills at bargain prices during the Great Depression. The purchasers, who were owners of Cranbrook Sawmills, dismantled their mill at Otway, and either sold or relocated the machinery to Penny. Like other sawmills during 1930–32, the Penny mill, then owned by the Joseph Campbell and John (Jack) Myers (1881–1960) partnership, scarcely operated. In 1932, fire completely destroyed the sawmill and yard lumber. At the time, Newlands, Snowshoe and Sinclair Mills were the only ones sawing, the latter having a big logging camp at Penny.

During the 1920s, W. Langmuir was the district forester. The forest ranger, residing in Penny for the Penny Ranger District covered an area that stretched from Dewey to Rider. His dispersed field staff, which were seasonal from spring to fall, travelled by boat or speeder. In 1948, two forestry speeders carrying 17 men to a forest fire at Loos collided near Bend. While the two most seriously injured went by freight train to Prince George, an amphibian plane later landed on the river at Penny to fly five of the less seriously injured for medical treatment. The ranger position was eliminated in the mid-1960s.

In 1933 Myers bought out his partner, and the following year rebuilt the Red Mountain Lumber Co. mill. In 1940, the 50,000-foot per shift capacity sawmill was again destroyed by fire, but the planing mill and processed lumber piles escaped conflagration. Fulfilling his prior commitment, Myers sold the mill to John F. McMillan and C. Earl Jaeck (1904–52), formerly at Bend, who changed the name to the Penny Sawmills. Jaeck died in a train/truck collision. 

In 1941, Elizabeth (1906–91)  (né Coats of Longworth, C. Earl Jaeck's cousin) & Rory (Roy) R.M. McGillivray (1903–94), formerly at Bend, relocated with children S.T. Michael (1930–2015) and Barbara (1935–2015), when Roy became general manager at the Penny mill. Elizabeth headed the local Red Cross fundraising effort during World War II.

In 1942, a new dry kiln was installed, and several new homes and bunkhouses were constructed on the mill site to accommodate the demand from running two shifts. Since the homes mostly lacked indoor plumbing, outhouses were the norm and water came from a tap at the end of the road. The following year, fire destroyed the planing mill boiler room, putting it out of operation for 6 weeks. This may have been the occasion when a passing CNR locomotive rescued part of the building.  In 1945, labour shortages closed one logging camp. The company name changed again to Standard Tie and Timber, when Standard Forest Products acquired the mill in late 1945 or early 1946. After an absence, Roy McGillivray returned as general manager. The family relocated to Prince George in 1953. On cremation, Roy's ashes were scattered in the Fraser at Penny.

In 1947, the large bunkhouse was constructed at Penny. The following year, the mill burned down, and a portable mill set up at the mouth of the Red Mountain Creek was used until the old mill was rebuilt. In 1952, renamed as the Penny Spruce Mills, the Totem Pole group, controlled by the Thurston family, purchased the operations, which included the bunkhouse and 35 family residences. Leboe Bros. of Crescent Spur provided mainly fir logs from the Goat River area, which were floated down the Fraser to the mill.

The mill, which employed about 120 during summer and 45 in winter, plus 40 at the logging camps, was one of the hardest hit by the strike of 1953. In 1955, the mill cookhouse burned to the ground. Closed in 1958, after the Bank of Montreal called the operating loan, the 100,000-foot capacity sawmill, steam and diesel power plants, 78-man bunkhouse, cookhouse, company houses, machine shop, garage, tractor house and various equipment were soon auctioned by court order.

During the 1940s–50s, as many as three sawmills operated in the area. The main mill, bought by Eagle Lake Lumber of Giscome, was renamed Penny Forest Products, and continued as a much smaller operation. In 1963, fire destroyed the mill and powerhouse, with only part of the trimmer left standing. Fire damage and outdated equipment made the investment in a rebuild unrealistic. Subsequently, Gordon Geddes ran portable mills until all sawmilling activity ceased in 1965. Northwood inherited the defunct Penny mill when it acquired the Eagle Lake mill in 1966. Long abandoned, the beehive burner, one of the largest in BC's history, still stands.

The back-to-the-land movement peaked in the 1970s, with two tree planting companies and fire suppression crews based in Penny. The movement largely comprised hippies, many U.S. draft dodgers, who temporarily settled along the East Line. In addition to occupying vacant houses, a commune existed by the river, which locals called "Buffalo Wallow".

Community
Population estimates were 25 (Rev. W.J. Patton) and 50–85 (Wrigley) for 1918, 200 by 1920, 100 by 1928, 100 by 1934, 203 for 1943 and 1944, and 200 for 1948. The population peaked in 1957/58 at 675, which included the logging camps.

Commonly, the postmaster in such towns was also a storeowner. Nels Pedersen (c.1885–?), the first postmaster 1916–19, ran a general store 1914–27 as a sole proprietorship or in partnership as Johnston & Pedersen. Thomas B. (1877–1952) & Betty Fae (c.1885–1945) Wall were storeowners, and she was postmaster 1919–25. William Birt and Joseph Melling purchased this store, with Birt as postmaster 1926–28.

Samuel (Sam) (1895–1940) & Annie (1890–1931) Michaylenko, who arrived as the CNR section foreman around 1919–20, operated a store 1929–31, and apparently applied to be postmaster. Their children were Nettie (1921–?), William (Bill) (1923–58), Helen (1925–?), Joseph (Joe) (1926–99), Florence (1928–?), Jessie (1930–?), and Magdelina (1931–?). When Annie died, Sam assumed responsibility for the children, except Magdelina, whom the Hinsbergers adopted. When Sam died, Nettie cared for her siblings. On adulthood, the children left Penny. 

Siblings Ole (1882–1956), Halvor (1891–1973), and Ingeborg L. (1884–1952) Mellos relocated from neighbouring Guilford in 1927. While the brothers developed a farm,
Ingeborg purchased the Pedersen general store, and was postmaster 1929–38. In 1929, Halvor Mellos formed the Mellos & Johnson Logging Co. Halvor, who became Ingeborg's business partner, was postmaster 1938–48. Together, they purchased the Bert and Melling store and sold their original property.

In 1932, Halvor married Anna Marie Haugen (1908–2008), who arrived in 1930. They raised their own daughter, Katherine, and niece Kathleen Johnson, after the death of Ole's wife Emma (c.1897–1942). A 1936 fire destroyed their hotel and store. Recently constructed and equipped with all modern conveniences, it was the most popular accommodation between Longworth and McBride. Their private hydro plant supplied electricity, and unlike most properties relying upon wells, they had running water. Buying the bunkhouse buildings at the abandoned relief camp , and transporting the wood by flatcar, Halvor rebuilt his house, storage and general store.

For many years, Anna Mellos managed their rooming house close to the store, which catered to short-term stays. After selling the store, Halvor performed odd jobs in the community. On Katherine's marriage to Jack Clements in 1953, the couple remained in Prince George. Although Kathleen married William Isfan at Penny in 1955, the couple were never residents. Anna resided in Penny 1930–95. 

In 1935, the widowed Victor Mellows (1898–1994), his mother Anna (1862–1943), and three sons Arne, Ivar and Oscar settled in Penny. Victor initially farmed, then worked at the sawmill. After Ivar and Oscar had left, Victor relocated in 1956. Returning from World War II, Arne Mellows married Carrie Benson (1923–2012) from Bend.
Their children raised in Penny were Karen, Lloyd, and Craig.

In 1948, Arne, and brother-in-law Carl A. Benson (1928–2015) from Bend, bought the Mellos' store, trading as Penny Merchants, and then as Penny Mercantile Co. The following year, Carl sold his share to Oscar. Two years later, Arne installed a gas pump for the increasing number of vehicles. Formerly, fuel came by rail in barrels. Arne was postmaster 1948–65, at which time the store closed permanently, and the family departed for Prince George.

Jack Taylor opened a coffee shop in his pool hall, and sold the business to Mr. & Mrs. C. Kirkwood.
	
Philippe (1900–84) & Anna (1905–83) Michaud, who resided 1952–61, opened the Dew Drop Inn, a coffee shop, poolroom and accommodation for boarders. Their children were Roland, Emile, René, Gisele, Madeleine, Fernande (c.1936–2008), Gilberte, Philip, Lorraine (1942– ), Louis, Louise, and Jeannie. Emile, who married Helen Bechtel, raised three children there. He stayed 1946–60 and subsequently remarried. Other adult siblings came and went. Fernande (Fern) married Mike Saiko (1927–98) a local, and their daughter was born in Penny. Gilberte married James (Jim) Kruger, and moved away. René, who played violin, suffered work and sports injuries. Coming and going, he married Teena Teichroeb in 1959. Lorraine married Richmond Lozeau, and moved away. Philip (Phil), who played guitar and sang, remained longer in Penny. Gisele married Bertil Stavely (c.1934–2014), and their three children were born while at Penny. Philippe, Anna and their three youngest left in 1961.

The first school, held in an old bunkhouse behind the sawmill, opened in 1920 or 1921, with Miss H. Thomas (possibly 1903–?) filling in until the arrival of Mrs. L.O. Cameron as the inaugural teacher. Owing to low student numbers, it closed 1925–29. A one-room school was built as a replacement in 1930. To facilitate a second teacher, it was remodelled as two classrooms in 1943. The following year, a teacherage was built on the school grounds, with propane lighting added in 1955.

The last of the three facilities, a two-room school opened for the 1953/54 year, with propane lighting added in 1954. The former building was moved off the grounds. The school closed for six years during the 1970s, but students taking correspondence courses continued to use a classroom. It reopened in 1977 with 13 students. Enrolment for 1945–50 in Grades 1–9 was 27–32, 1953–60 in Grades 1–8 was 31–51, 1963–70 in Grades 1–7 was 6–34, 1970–78 in Grades K–7 was 7–13, and 1981–84 in Grades K–7 was 10–12. Having only seven students, the school closed permanently in 1985, with the building ultimately removed.

The community club, formed in 1932, held functions for nine years in the sawmill cookhouse. The community hall was built in 1941. The building, severely damaged by heavy snow in 1946, was repaired and an electrical generator installed two years later. The hall hosted country artists, professional entertainers, movie screenings and many weddings. 

John E. (1906–87) & Jean (1909–96) Humphreys arrived in late 1946 or early 1947. To fill individual customer orders, John, as shipper, coordinated product through the planer mill and into boxcars for delivery. Their children were John A. (1932–2006), Jean (1933–2002), James (Jim) (1940–2011), and Jerry (1945– ). John Jr. married  Margaret Boudreau.  Jean Jr. left, trained as a nurse, and married Arne May. John Sr. rented and showed movies in the community hall. The Friday night screenings were weekly in the summer and biweekly in the winter. Admission was 50 cents. Active in the social life, Jean Sr., a registered nurse, delivered 14 of the community babies. On buying the Dome Creek store, they left in 1957 . After boarding away for high school, Jim joined his parents at Dome Creek.
	
Badminton was popular. The hall was a venue for community dances during World War II, when many were in aid of the Red Cross. The post-war dances often attracted visitors from surrounding communities. The hall, falling into disuse during the 1960s, was renovated in 1971 and used for badminton during the 1970s–1980s.

In his role as rector of All Saints Anglican, McBride, Rev. Duncan Cameron regularly conducted Sunday evening services in the Penny schoolhouse, as did his predecessor, Rev. J.J. Cowan, each month. A Sunday school commenced in 1946. St. Paul's United Church, McBride, also held evening services in the Penny school. The priest came from Giscome each month to St. James Catholic Church, which opened in 1954. Formerly, their services were conducted in the school, with Catholic, Anglican and United alternating weeks. The deconsecrated Catholic building became a residence.

When the mill closed, most of the population left. Some abandoned their privately owned houses, which had become worthless.

The Penny cemetery, 200–300 feet along the side road where the boat ramp road makes a right angle bend, is on land provided by Halvor Mellos. Volunteer male labour produced the coffins and dug the graves, and the women prepared the bodies.

A homecoming reunion for former residents occurred August 18–20, 1995, for which the book covering the community's history was compiled. At the time, the permanent population of 11 was meagre in relation to the 36 dwellings.

Boudreau family
Joseph (Joe) (1889–1969) & Bessie (1894–1983) Boudreau arrived in 1923. They built a house on their preemption in 1928. Joe was a trapper and logger, who could play the violin. Bessie, an avid gardener, who delivered many of the community's babies, could play the piano, flute and harp. Their children were M. Isabelle (1923–2001), Eveline (1925–98), Joseph E. (Joe Jr.) (1929–91), Clarence (1931– ), E. Jack (1933–2018), Margaret (1934– ), and June. The family made their own entertainment, singing and playing musical instruments, and the community attended these gatherings at their place.

M. Isabelle left, but returned for her wedding to Peter Motiuk (1920–88). Never residing as a couple in Penny, their children were Patricia (Pat) and Cary. Isabelle provided a home away from home to family members who came to Prince George for high school.

Eveline married resident Jack McKinley (1924–2017), a talented Prince George piano player. They supplied the music for many events. Their children raised in Penny were Gail, Barry, and Rocky L., with Melody and Charlene born after the family left in 1956.

Josie married William F. (Bud) Proctor in 1946. Months earlier, Bud, a local logger, suffered a skull fracture when struck by a falling tree. Josie and daughter Sandra spent part of 1947 with Bud in Merritt. Josie returned to Penny prior to the birth of son Dwayne. Tragically, 20-month-old Sandra, died of accidental ingestion of gasoline. Janet A. and J. Mark were born subsequently. In 1956, Josie left permanently to work in Prince George. Remarried, she and Marcien Fisher, of Penny, had three children.

Joe Jr. married Edith (Penny) Lammle (1934–2011) at Penny. Their children raised there were Rhoda, Donna (1953–2009), Judy, and William. Joe, a sawfiler then millwright, departed with his family to pursue other work opportunities.

Clarence married Olga Horn (1932– ), one of the two teachers who had arrived for the 1950/51 school year. Their children Dan, Diane Louise (1954–2009), Larry, Maxine, and Jenny, attended the Penny school, as well as three of the grandchildren. Dan has authored five books, When 15, Clarence joined his father and older brother in driving their horse team that hauled logs for milling. In 1956, he bought a Caterpillar D6 to clear their land for potato farming. When cattle ranching proved unprofitable, he focused on logging, land clearing and snowplowing. He was fire warden for many years, and ran (1980–1996) the salmon hatchery (1980–2006) located on their property. In retirement, he voluntarily maintained the Longworth–Penny road with his Cat D6, and remained a resident for nearly 80 years. During the 1970s, when the school closed temporarily, Olga supervised the correspondence course children. Although away from teaching while raising her children, she did substitute when needed. She worked in, and did the bookkeeping for, the hatchery. She also kept a large garden and canned the produce. They acquired their first electricity generator in 1982. Diane Louise is the most recent burial at the cemetery. Clarence, having resided for 80 years, the couple left in 2011. 

E. Jack and ex-wife, Andreen E. Spoklie (1942–2015), had two children, Kelly and Kim., Jack worked various jobs in the mill and in driving logs down the river. In 1967, residents protested the closure of their post-office and it reopened after six weeks. Jack was postmaster 1967–76, chair of the citizens committee, and remained a resident. He left in 1976. He finished his career elsewhere as a licensed scaler, an industrial first-aid attendant, and forest firefighter mostly with the Ministry of Forests. In 1999 on retirement, he wrote the first of his 10 published books on the region's history and personalities. 

Margaret married logger John A. Humphreys.  Their children were David J., James (Jim) C., and Allan. By 16, Margaret could harness and work her father's horse team. Starting work at 15, John spent about 15 years at the lumber camps or the mill. The family left in 1965.

June Boudreau worked briefly in Prince George, before marrying William (Bill) Benedict (1928–2013), and having children Julie (died of SIDS at six months), Shirley (Allannah), Darlene, and Wayne. The Penny station was busy for most of Bill's tenure as CNR station agent 1954–65, but the family departed after sawmilling activity ceased. In 1993, he returned to live in Penny for a number of years, and his ashes were spread at the cemetery. Remarried, June Vandermark has been a prolific writer of letters to the editor, which criticize mainline religious, environmental, and sundry matters.

Pastor family, scouts, guides & polio outbreak
Joseph Pastor (1896–1982) settled in 1934. His wife Mary (1900–84), and children Mary E. (1920–86), Theresa (Terry) M. (1921–84), and Joseph (Joe) (1925–2006), joined him from Hungary. Although he worked in the sawmill during the earlier years, the farm was his primary involvement. Mary Sr. delivered milk, cream, butter and cheese to residents. On retiring in 1973, they left.

Joseph was also a hunting guide, who had been shot during World War I and the bullet was removed from his elbow in 1944. His Hungarian friend, Joseph Kobra (1902–65), a sometime Penny resident since the 1940s, followed him from Lindup, remaining in the Penny/Lindup area for 40 years.

In 1937, Mary married Gustof (Gus) Frenkel (1905–83), but they never resided as a couple in Penny. Their children were John, Margaret, Sheila and Marie.

In 1943, Terry married J. Earl Lousier (1924–2011). Initially a sawmill blade tooth setter, Earl became a sawyer after two years. Danny, their son, was born in Penny, with Theresa (Terry) Ann, Bonita (Bonnie), and Lorraine born after the family left in 1952.

During the mid-1940s, a Scout troop and Wolf Cub pack operated. Charles (Charlie) Adcock, the CNR section foreman, was scoutmaster, and Earl Lousier was his assistant. Thurston Berg led the Cubs. On Charlie's transfer, Larry Willington became scoutmaster and Alice Sinclair had taken charge of the cubs, but these activities soon folded.

In 1946, Joe Jr. married Marie Jopp (1924–2014). Joe, who played trumpet at the dances, months earlier had lost two toes in a logging accident. Marie was one of the two teachers for the 1944/45 to 1946/47 school years, after which she was available as a substitute. During the mid-to-late 1940s, she led the Girl Guides, who were involved in a range of events. In 1950, Marie was briefly confined to hospital in Prince George with suspected polio, before convalescing at home. Their children raised in Penny were Gary (1948– ), Richard (Ritchie) (1949–2004), Shirley (1961– ), Stewart (1953–93), and Terry-Lynn (1955– ), with Ronnie born after the family left in 1955.

In 1952, Mrs. R. Clark and Mrs. A. Ward are recorded as teachers for the Girl Guides and Brownies, the latter company having been recently organized, but these groups are not mentioned after 1953.

John Kuz (1913–50) was the only Penny resident to die of polio. He had arrived in Penny in 1937, where his wife Anne
(probably 1917–2003) and baby Harold (probably 1937–2016) soon joined them. They were active in community life, and their subsequent children raised in Penny were Leona (1939– ), M. Elaine (1943– ), and John (1949– ). Initially a logger, John Sr. became a mill labourer, oiler, and finally millwright, where in 1943 he lost three toes in a mill accident. In 1949, a 12-foot fall required a hospital visit. On John's death in hospital at Prince George, public functions in Penny were cancelled and the school closed as a precaution, which was repeated during another polio outbreak two years later. The community collected almost $1,100 for the family, who left in 1951.

Riggs & Finer families
In 1928, widower Frederick (Dick) R. Finer
(1884–1952) arrived in Penny. The following year, his children Mabel (1914–2007), Irene (1916–2002), and Allen (1918–2010), joined him. Mabel married Wilbert (Bert) Riggs (1912–99) of Longworth in 1932, where they homesteaded, before residing off and on in Penny from 1936. Bert was a logger, sawmill worker, and with Mabel, ran their small farm. 
 
In 1937, Irene Finer left and married N. Wilfrid Appleyard (c.1901–?). Allen R. Finer enlisted during World War II, was wounded, married, and settled in Vancouver. His father soon followed.

In 1942, the Riggs resettled in Penny. Their children were Clarence (1933–45), Lelia, Keith (1937– ), Patricia (Pat) (1945– ), and Juanita (Nita) (1947– ). Clarence drowned at Guilford Lumber mill. Mabel Riggs operated an iced confectionary booth from her front porch during the summertime. Bert Riggs was hospitalized several times, being evacuated by amphibian plane on one occasion. After relocating to and from Prince George for a couple of years, the family, except Lelia, returned. Keith left for work, and Lelia I. married Lawrence B. Tindill. (1927–2003). Bert relocated for work in 1958, and Mabel, Pat and Nita joined him in 1963. Nita married David Solecki, and Pat married Cornelius Evert (Casey) Van Beek.

Crime, calamity & safety measures
During the 1927 forest fire, women and children were temporarily evacuated by special train to Dome Creek.

A sudden death in 1934 prompted an investigative visit by the coroner and a constable from Prince George. 

Logger G. Edward Hooker (1915–36), formerly at Bend, slipped and drowned while breaking up a logjam. His body was found over seven months later downriver at Sinclair Mills.

In 1944 and 1945, the police arrested the offenders responsible for break and entries at the store.

A rolling log fatally crushed William Gorrick (1915–48).

Although limited mentions of houses burning to the ground, it was likely a common occurrence.

In 1957, safecrackers stole $4,000 in cash from the store.

While hunting near Penny, Kalman Malzsencizky mistook his friend, Bela Bill Cservenka
(1927–65), for a moose and fatally shot him. First aid was administered immediately and after a boat trip back to the Pastor farm, where the victim died four hours after the incident. At his trial, Malzsencizky pleaded guilty to criminal negligence. Schervenka's widow was awarded $60,719 in damages under the provincial Families Compensation Act.

A self-inflicted rifle wound took a hunter's life on the access road.

In 1975, Imre Sorban fired shots at a boatload of people on the outskirts of Penny, forced another woman into a car, and later shot out two tires on the vehicle before he was subdued. Another victim sustained leg wounds from a shotgun blast. Midway through his trial, Sorban pleaded guilty to charges of carrying an offensive weapon and illegally confining another person.

When ice jams upstream and downstream blocked the river during the 1980/81 winter, owners could not reach their cars parked on the west bank, and flooding submerged 13 vehicles and carried off several boats. Though the townsite on higher ground was safe, houses in low-lying areas were flooded.

Relief programs during the Great Depression
The Aleza Lake to Tête Jaune highway-construction relief project began in 1931. The seven camps between Aleza Lake and McBride housed 500 workers. Discontent in the camps prompted demands for increased wages, and strike action occurred in April and July 1932, at which time the workers departed for Prince George. In August 1932, the province redirected the men to these isolated locations, now designated as non-work relief camps. Camp 88, Penny, was the largest of the group. On 19 November 1932, a physical confrontation with the camp foreman led to his replacement and a police investigation. On 25 November 1932, police arrested three agitators from the camp for travelling without railway tickets and they received one-month prison sentences. By month end, the camp held its full complement of 108 men. The camp closed in October 1933. 

The Penny location at about Mile 72 occupied the former GTP construction camp (formerly about Mile 162). In 1934, Edward (Ed) V. (1888–1951) & Elsie (1904–95) Chambers moved from Lindup to the camp, where Ed was employed, and by 1936, he worked at a logging camp across the river. Their children were D. Bernice (c.1923–?), James (Jim) (1924–?), Marie (possibly 1926–2010), Lillian Jean (c.1928–2002), Charles Lindburgh (Lindy) (1929–79), M. Jean (1930–2012), and Bette.
	
The family settled in Penny just before World War II, with the children spending varying periods of their adult lives there. Ed remained until his death, and Elsie stayed. Bernice  married Len Gagnon (1909–59), who worked in the sawmill. James (Jim) E. enlisted 1942–46, married Marion Hooker (1924–2002) of Bend, and settled in Vancouver. Marie moved to Jasper, and enlisted 1944–46. She lived in Vancouver and married J. McNeil. Lillian Jean enlisted 1944–45, married Chester Whelen (c.1921–2012), and settled in Alberta, but later married Michael Kosteck. Lindy remained based in Penny, married Alice Taylor, but later moved. M. Jean married local Charles (Charlie) F. Benton. Bette left for Vancouver and married.

Roads
In 1947, Standard Tie and Timber graded a  road through the town. By 1951, there were 21 cars in the community, but still only one mile of road. When Highway 16, linking Prince George and McBride, opened in 1969, many residents parked their vehicles on the opposite bank of the Fraser River. In winter, the frozen river could usually be crossed by an ice bridge, but if the weather was unusually mild, the train provided the only access. A proposal for a reaction ferry or bridge access divided the community. In 1995, volunteers upgraded a  logging road, and for the next 20 years, maintained this only road access to the community. In 2017, the province agreed to maintain the private road to Longworth for two years. A replacement contract is under consideration.

Electricity, broadcast transmissions & communications devices
From 1929, the CNR telephone lines opened for public usage, linking Dome Creek with Prince George. Fifty years later, the CN lines from Giscome still served Penny's crank-style phones on a party line. In the 1990s, the service continued to be erratic, because Telus could not justify the cost of dedicated lines for so few customers.

Using a 150-foot wire strung between two 50-foot poles as an aerial, predominantly battery-powered radios received better reception from certain stations in Calgary or the U.S. west coast.

Some places had diesel or alternately powered generators. Otherwise, oil or gas lamps provided light and wood-burning stoves heat. Around 1950, the sawmill wired and supplied electricity to many company houses, which ceased when the mill closed. There are no BC Hydro transmission lines.

A new transmitter, installed by CKPG-TV on Mount Tabor in 1964, provided reception as far southeast as Longworth & Penny.

Footnotes

References

 
 
 
 
 
 
 
 
 
 
 

Robson Valley
Populated places in the Regional District of Fraser-Fort George
Populated places on the Fraser River
Unincorporated settlements in British Columbia
Grand Trunk Pacific Railway stations